Midnight Vampire (午夜殭屍) is a 1936 Hong Kong film directed by Yeung Kung-Leung. It is the first movie to feature a Jiangshi (Chinese hopping vampire).

Cast
Yeung Yat-Ping	 	 
Woo Dip-Ying	 	 
Chao Fei-Fei	 	 
Chiu King-Wan	 	 
Chu Po-Chuen	 	 
Wong Sau-Nin	 	 
Hoh Ho-Man 	 
Tsui Tai-Cheung	 	 
Tsak Sin-Chung	 	 
Cheng Lau-Kuen

References

External links
Midnight Vampire at IMDB
Midnight Vampire at HKMDB

1936 films
1936 horror films
Hong Kong action films
1930s monster movies
Jiangshi films
1930s action films
Hong Kong black-and-white films
1936 directorial debut films